The Journal of Educational Administration and History is a peer-reviewed academic journal of educational administration. It is published by Routledge and indexed in Scopus.

References 

Education journals
Routledge academic journals
Publications with year of establishment missing